Pseudotrichonotus is a genus of fish in the family Pseudotrichonotidae native to the Indian and Pacific Ocean. This genus is the only member of its family.

Species
There are currently 4 recognized species in this genus:
 Pseudotrichonotus altivelis Yoshino & Araga, 1975
 Pseudotrichonotus belos A. C. Gill & Pogonoski, 2016 (Dart sand-diving lizardfish) 
 Pseudotrichonotus caeruleoflavus G. R. Allen, Erdmann, Suharti & Sianipar, 2017 
 Pseudotrichonotus xanthotaenia Parin, 1992

References

Aulopiformes
Fish of the Indian Ocean
Fish of the Pacific Ocean
Marine fish genera